Prince Somsanith Vongkotrattana (19 April 1913 – 1975) was the Prime Minister of Laos in 1960. 

He was born in Luang Prabang, Laos. His mother, Sanghiemkham, was one of Prince Bounkhong daughters, married Souvannarath, would late become Prime Minister, making Prince Souvanna Phouma, Prince Souphanouvong, Prince Phetsarath and Prince Kindavong his step uncles.

He was the minister of interior and justice in the Lao Issara government from 1945 to 1946, and followed the cabinet into exile in Thailand 1946-1949. Following his return to Laos, he was appointed as minister of finance (1959-1960) and minister of justice. He was appointed as Prime Minister of Laos by the king in June 1960, and his government was overthrown later in 1960.

He was elected President of National Assembly from 1961 to 1963.

References

Presidents of the National Assembly of Laos
Prime Ministers of Laos
Finance Ministers of Laos
1913 births
1975 deaths
Committee for the Defence of National Interests politicians
People from Luang Prabang